Cyrto-hypnum minutulum is a species of moss belonging to the family Thuidiaceae.

Synonym:
 Hypnum eccremocarpum Müll. Hal.
 Hypnum schiedeanum Müll. Hal. 
 Thuidium exasperatum Mitt. 
 Thuidium glaucescens Schimp. ex Besch. 
 Thuidium minutulum (Hedw.) Schimp. 
 Thuidium tuerckheimii Müll. Hal. 
 Thuidium tuerckheimii var. angustatum Cardot 
 Thuidium wrightii A. Jaeger

References

Hypnales